Norway Lake is a lake in Cass County, Minnesota, in the United States.

Norway Lake was named for Norway pines lining its banks.

See also
List of lakes in Minnesota

References

Lakes of Minnesota
Lakes of Cass County, Minnesota